Khaled El-Ali El-Rifai (born 9 August 1955) is a Syrian wrestler. He competed in the men's freestyle 48 kg at the 1980 Summer Olympics.

References

1955 births
Living people
Syrian male sport wrestlers
Olympic wrestlers of Syria
Wrestlers at the 1980 Summer Olympics
Place of birth missing (living people)
Wrestlers at the 1982 Asian Games
Asian Games competitors for Syria